Panchaali is a 1959 Indian Tamil-language drama film directed by Muktha Srinivasan, produced by M. A. Thyagarajan, and written by Naga Shanmugam with the music composed by K. V. Mahadevan. It stars R. S. Manohar and Devika, with V. K. Ramasamy, L. Vijayalakshmi, T. P. Muthulakshmi, T. K. Ramachandran and Lakshmi Prabha in supporting roles.

Plot 

During the Panchayat elections held in the village Ponnaruvi, the Ayurveda specialist doctor, Dr. Natarajan defeats Anandan, the son of Kalyani Ammal. This causes Anandan and his mother, Kalyani to hate the kindhearted doctor. Apart from Anandan, Kalyani takes care of her other child, Gomathi and her nephew, Raghavan, whom she raises as her own child.

After returning from Madras, where he went to study medicine, Raghavan wins over the villagers with his medical expertise and helping hand. Oblivious to Kalyani's plans to get him married to Gomathi, he falls in love with Dr. Natarajan's daughter Panchaali. The rest of the film is about Raghavan discovering Anandan's misdemeanors as a servant in disguise. Complications arise when Anandan decides to murder his enemies.

Cast 

 R. S. Manohar
 Devika
 V. K. Ramasamy
 L. Vijayalakshmi
 Lakshmi Prabha
 T. P. Muthulakshmi
 T. K. Ramachandran
 S. Rama Rao
 K. K. Soundar
 S. S. Srinivasan
 "Karadi" Muthu
 R. Pakkirisamy
 Chandra
 E. R. Shanthakumari
 M. S. Thamizharasi
 M. Natarajan
 Stunt P. Krishnan

Reception 
Randor Guy stated that the film did well at the box office, despite the predictable storyline.

Soundtrack 
Music by K. V. Mahadevan and lyrics were written by A. Maruthakasi and Ku. Sa. Krishnamoorthi. The song "Oru Murai Paarthalae Podhum" is tuned in the raga Kalyani.

References

External links 
 

1950s Tamil-language films
1959 drama films
1959 films
Films directed by Muktha Srinivasan
Films scored by K. V. Mahadevan
Indian black-and-white films
Indian drama films
Indian satirical films